"Gettin' Enough??" is the second single from British singer Lil' Chris' debut self-titled album. Although the song failed to repeat the success of its predecessor "Checkin' It Out", it peaked at number 17 on the UK Singles Chart.

Track listing
CD1
 "Gettin' Enough??" - 2:56
 "Crossing the Line" - 2:41
CD2
 "Gettin' Enough??" - 2:56
 "Don't Ask (Cos It Kills Me)" - 3:06
 "Gettin' Enough??" [J Dub Remix] - 3:34
 Lil' Chris Interview - 5:04

Music video
The music video takes the form of a spoof '80s educational video on puberty and sex. The video contains scenes showing various teenagers playing musical instruments, along with captions containing sexual innuendos (e.g. "A clean instrument is a happy instrument"). The video was directed by Brett Simon.

References

2006 singles
Lil' Chris songs
2006 songs
Songs written by Lil' Chris
Songs written by Nigel Butler
Songs written by Ray Hedges
Music videos directed by Brett Simon